Amandus is a 1966 Slovene film directed by France Štiglic. It is based on a novel by Ivan Tavčar and was adapted for the screen by Andrej Hieng. It is set at the end of the 17th century in the area that is now Slovenia at a time of religious intolerance with Amandus, a Catholic priest, determined to persecute local Protestants.

External links

Yugoslav drama films
Slovenian drama films
1966 films
Slovene-language films
Anti-Protestantism
Films set in Slovenia